1929 Drexel Dragons football team represented Drexel Institute—now known as Drexel University—in the 1929 college football season. Led by Walter Halas in his third season as head coach, the team compiled a record of 6–3–1.

Schedule

Roster

References

Drexel
Drexel Dragons football seasons
Drexel Dragons football